Flagler County is a county located in the northeastern portion of the U.S. state of Florida. As of the 2020 census, the population was 115,378. Its county seat is Bunnell, and the largest city is Palm Coast. Created in 1917 from portions of Saint Johns and Volusia Counties, it was named for Henry Flagler, who built the Florida East Coast Railway.

Flagler County is included in the Deltona–Daytona Beach–Ormond Beach, FL metropolitan statistical area, and is also included in the Orlando-Deltona-Daytona Beach, FL Combined Statistical Area.

History
In 1974, Marco Polo Park, a theme park off Interstate 95 opened.  It was never profitable and closed soon after.

In 1998, when two brush fires threatened to become one huge brush fire in Flagler County, a mandatory evacuation was ordered for the entire county.  This was the first and so far the only time a whole county was evacuated in Florida for a wildfire.

Geography

Adjacent counties
 St. Johns County, Florida - north
 Volusia County, Florida - south
 Putnam County, Florida - west

Parks and gardens

 Belle Terre Park
 Betty Steflik Preserve 
 Bings Landing 
 Bird of Paradise Nature Reserve
 Bull Creek Campground 
 Bulow Creek State Park
 Bulow Plantation Ruins Historic State Park
 Central Park in Town Center
 Children's Memorial Garden
 Gamble Rogers Memorial State Recreation Area
 Graham Swamp Preserve 
 Haw Creek Preserve / Russell Landing 
 Heroes Memorial Park
 Herschel King Park 
 Hidden Trails Park 
 James F. Holland Memorial Park
 Jungle Hut Park 
 Lehigh Trail 
 Longs Landing Estuary
 Malacompra Park 
 Moody Homestead Park 
 Old Dixie Park 
 Old Salt Park 
 Palm Coast Community Center & Park
 Palm Coast Linear Park
 Princess Place Preserve 
 Ralph Carter Park
 River to Sea Preserve 
 Seminole Woods Neighborhood Park
 Shell Bluff Park 
 Silver Lake Park
 St. Joe Walkway
 Varn Park 
 Veteran's Park
 Wadsworth Park 
 Washington Oaks State Gardens
 Waterfront Park
 Wickline Park

Rivers and waterways
 Atlantic Ocean
 Dead Lake
 Crescent Lake
 Intracoastal Waterway
 Matanzas River
 Pellicer Creek

Demographics

As of the 2020 United States census, there were 115,378 people, 44,040 households, and 31,591 families residing in the county.

As of the census of 2010, there were 95,696 people, 39,186 households, and 27,843 families residing in the county.  The population density was 197.1 people per square mile.  There were 48,595 housing units. The racial makeup of the county was 82.3% White, 11.4% Black or African American.  8.6% of the population were Hispanic or Latino of any race.

In the county, the population was spread out, with 19.9% under the age of 18, and 24.5% who were 65 years of age or older.

The median income for a household in the county was $51,049, and the median income for a family was $58,327.

Flagler county was ranked the fastest-growing county in the nation by the US Census Bureau from 2000 to 2005, boasting a 53.3% change, with a July 1, 2005 population estimate at 76,410.  As of 2016 the largest ancestry group in the county was English-American at 18.1% of the county, followed by German-American at 12.7% and Irish-American also at 12.7%.

Transportation

Airports
 Flagler County Airport is the primary airport within the county. It does not provide commercial air services but does serve private, student and business aviation.

Major roads
  Interstate 95
  U.S. 1
  SR A1A
  SR 11
  SR 20
  SR 100

Other
 The Florida East Coast Railway provides rail freight services in the county.
 The Intracoastal Waterway runs just in from the coast in eastern Flagler County and provides for freight shipping and recreational boating.

Politics

Voter registration
According to the Secretary of State's office, Republicans are a plurality of registered voters in Flagler County.

Statewide elections

Education
Flagler County Public Schools enroll approximately 13,000 students. The system includes two public high schools, Flagler Palm Coast and Matanzas High School. The county also has five elementary schools and two middle schools.
All elementary schools will be Pre-K to 6th grade and middle schools 7th and 8th.  
Flagler County schools are:
 Belle Terre Elementary K-6th
 Bunnell Elementary K-6th
 Rymfire Elementary K-6th
 Old Kings Elementary K-6th
 Wadsworth Elementary K-6th
 St. Elizabeth Ann Seton Catholic School Pre K-8th
 Buddy Taylor Middle School 7th-8th
 Indian Trails Middle School 7th-8th
 Matanzas High School 9th-12th
 Flagler Palm Coast High School 9th-12th
 Pathways Academy (alternative school)
 iFlagler Virtual School 7th-12th
 Imagine School at Town Center (charter)
 Academies of Excellence's Heritage Academy (charter) (closed after the 2011–2012 school year)

In addition, Daytona State College maintains a branch campus in Palm Coast.

Libraries
Flagler County Library System consists of two branches with over 57,000 borrowers. The Main Branch is located at 2500 Palm Coast Pkwy NW, Palm Coast and the Bunnell Branch is located at 103 E Moody Blvd, Bunnell. The Flagler County Library system currently employees eighteen staff, with fourteen full-time employees and four part-time employees with an annual operating budget of $1 million.

The Flagler County Public Library was created by the County Commission in 1987, but as early as 1937, a room of the County Courthouse in Bunnell was set aside for a small library, which was sponsored by the Colony Club. The current library director is Holly Albanese.

The Flagler County Library System offers a wide variety of services beyond traditional library services. They have an e-book collection through Overdrive and Axis360. The library system will assist patrons in filing taxes, and applying for some government programs, as well as with passport applications. Both libraries offer fax services, and the Main Branch also offers scanning services.

In 2001, the Flagler County Library System began a local oral history project called the "Flagler County Memories Project". This project is currently being recorded and then preserved on compact discs. The project mission states, "This collection of oral life histories seeks to sample the common themes and unique stories of selected local residents."

Communities

Cities
 Bunnell
 Flagler Beach
 Palm Coast

Towns
 Beverly Beach
 Marineland

Unincorporated communities

 Bimini
 Cody's Corner
 Daytona North
 Dupont
 Espanola
 Favoretta
 Flagler Estates (also in St. Johns County)
 Hammock
 Korona
 Orange Hammock
 Painters Hill
 Relay
 St. Johns Park

See also
 Bike trails in Florida (paved)
 National Register of Historic Places listings in Flagler County, Florida
 Halifax area
 First Coast

Notes

References

External links

Government links/Constitutional offices
 Flagler County Board of County Commissioners official website
 Flagler County Supervisor of Elections
 Flagler County Property Appraiser
 Flagler County Sheriff's Office
 Flagler County Tax Collector

Special districts
 Flagler County Public Schools
 St. Johns River Water Management District

Judicial branch
 Flagler County Clerk of Courts
  Public Defender, 7th Judicial Circuit of Florida serving Flagler, Putnam, St. Johns, and Volusia counties
  Office of the State Attorney, 7th Judicial Circuit of Florida
  Circuit and County Court for the 7th Judicial Circuit of Florida

Tourism links
 Flagler County Tourist Development Council

 
1917 establishments in Florida
Populated places established in 1917
Florida counties
Counties in Greater Orlando
North Florida